This is a list of county-level divisions in the province of Hunan by population.

2010 Census

Counties and county-level cities

Districts

References

Hunan
Hunan
Geography of Hunan